Hacıahmetlitepeköy is a village in the Ağaçören District, Aksaray Province, Turkey. Its population is 170 (2021).

References

Villages in Ağaçören District